Sketches from an American Journey is an album by David Arkenstone, released in 2002. It is inspired by the natural landscapes of the United States. There is far less focus on synthesizers than on most other Arkenstone releases. Piano and an orchestra are featured prominently throughout the album.

The album was re-released by Domo Records in 2010.

Track listing
"New Day" – 4:14
"Sunset Highway" – 4:15
"Places in the Heart" – 4:23
"Full Sail" – 4:00
"Pacific Rain" – 4:42
"Sketches of the Dream" – 5:40
"The Colors of Fall" – 5:06
"The American Journey" – 4:38
"Voice of a New Land" – 5:30
"Wild River" – 4:47
"Surrounded by Beauty" – 3:45
 All tracks composed by David Arkenstone

Personnel
 David Arkenstone – guitar, mandolin, keyboards, bass, pennywhistle, bouzouki, percussion
 Don Markese – soprano sax, flute, piccolo
 Seth Osburn – piano
 Chad Watson – bass
 John Wakefield – percussion
 Ric Craig – drums
 Marc Antoine – guitar on "Sunset Highway"
 The Recording Arts Orchestra of Salt Lake City

2002 albums
David Arkenstone albums